Subroto Ghosh (born 15 July 1987 in Patna, Bihar) is an Indian first-class cricketer who played for Jharkhand cricket team. He was a right-handed wicket-keeper batsman.

References

External links
 
 

1987 births
Living people
Indian cricketers
Cricketers from Patna
Jharkhand cricketers
East Zone cricketers